The 1966–67 St. John's Redmen basketball team represented St. John's University during the 1966–67 NCAA Division I men's basketball season. The team was coached by Lou Carnesecca in his second year at the school. St. John's home games were played at Alumni Hall and Madison Square Garden.

Roster

Schedule and results

|-
!colspan=9 style="background:#FF0000; color:#FFFFFF;"| Regular Season

|-
!colspan=9 style="background:#FF0000; color:#FFFFFF;"| NCAA Tournament

References

St. John's Red Storm men's basketball seasons
St. John's
St John
St John